Etravirine (ETR, brand name Intelence, formerly known as TMC125) is a drug used for the treatment of HIV.  Etravirine is a non-nucleoside reverse transcriptase inhibitor (NNRTI). Unlike the currently available agents in the class, resistance to other NNRTIs does not seem to confer resistance to etravirine.  Etravirine is marketed by Janssen, a subsidiary of Johnson & Johnson.  In January 2008, the Food and Drug Administration approved its use for patients with established resistance to other drugs, making it the 30th anti-HIV drug approved in the United States and the first to be approved in 2008. It was also approved for use in Canada on April 1, 2008.

Etravirine is licensed in the United States, Canada, Israel, Russia, Australia and the European Union, and is under regulatory review in Switzerland.

Indications and dosage
Etravirine, in combination with other anti-retrovirals, is indicated for the treatment of human immunodeficiency virus type 1 (HIV-1) infection in antiretroviral treatment-experienced adult patients, who have evidence of viral replication and HIV-1 strains resistant to a non-nucleoside reverse transcriptase inhibitor (NNRTI) and other antiretroviral agents. 

The recommended dose of etravirine is 200 mg (2 x 100 mg tablets, or 1 x 200 mg tablet as of 03/18/2011) taken twice daily following a meal. The type of food does not affect the exposure to etravirine.

Contraindication
Each 100 mg etravirine tablet contains 160 mg of lactose. Patients with rare hereditary problems of galactose intolerance, the Lapp lactase deficiency or glucose-galactose malabsorption should not take this medicine.

Mechanism of action
Etravirine is a second-generation non-nucleoside reverse transcriptase inhibitor (NNRTI), designed to be active against HIV with mutations that confer resistance to the two most commonly prescribed first-generation NNRTIs, mutation K103N for efavirenz and Y181C for nevirapine.  This potency appears to be related to etravirine's flexibility as a molecule. Etravirine is a diarylpyrimidine (DAPY), a type of organic molecule with some conformational isomerism that can bind the enzyme reverse transcriptase in multiple conformations, allowing for a more robust interaction between etravirine and the enzyme, even in the presence of mutations.  Other diarylpyrimidine-analogues are currently being used as anti-HIV agents, notably rilpivirine.

Warnings and risks
In 2009, the prescribing information for etravirine was modified to include "postmarketing reports of cases of Stevens–Johnson syndrome, toxic epidermal necrolysis and erythema multiforme, as well as hypersensitivity reactions characterized by rash, constitutional findings, and sometimes organ dysfunction, including liver failure. Intelence therapy should be immediately discontinued when signs and symptoms of severe skin or hypersensitivity reactions develop."

Repositioning

Etravine has been studied for use in a drug repositioning application. In a paper published in the medical journal Movement Disorders, etravirine was shown to cause an increase in frataxin production. Frataxin deficiency is a key component to Friedreich's ataxia, a genetically inherited disease that causes the progressive loss of coordination and muscle strength leading to motor incapacitation and the full-time use of a wheelchair.

Chemistry

Etravine forms as colourless orthorhombic crystals in space group Pna21. The structures of these and of a number of solvate and salt forms have been reported.

References

External links 
 

CYP3A4 inducers
Hepatotoxins
Non-nucleoside reverse transcriptase inhibitors
Aminopyrimidines
Johnson & Johnson brands
Nitriles
Organobromides
Belgian inventions
Diaryl ethers